Pierluigi Collina (born 13 February 1960) is an Italian former football referee. He was named "The World's Best Referee" by the International Federation of Football History & Statistics six consecutive times from 1998-2003.

Collina is still involved in football as an unpaid consultant to the Italian Football Referees Association (AIA), the Head of Referees for the Football Federation of Ukraine since 2010, a member of the UEFA Referees Committee, and Chairman of the FIFA referees committee.

Refereeing career
Collina was born in Bologna and attended the University of Bologna, graduating with a degree in economics in 1984. During his teenage years, he played as a centre-back for a local team, but was persuaded in 1977 to take a referee's course, where it was discovered that he had a particular aptitude for the job. Within three years he was officiating at the highest level of regional matches, while also completing his compulsory military service. In 1988, he progressed more rapidly than normal to the national third division, Serie C1 and Serie C2. After three seasons, he was promoted to officiating Serie B and Serie A matches.

Around this time, Collina developed a severe form of alopecia, resulting in the permanent loss of all his facial hair, giving him his distinctive bald appearance and earning the nickname Kojak.

In 1995, after he had officiated at 43 Serie A matches, he was placed on FIFA's Referees List. He was allocated five matches at the 1996 Olympic Games, including the final between Nigeria and Argentina. He refereed the 1999 UEFA Champions League Final between Bayern Munich and Manchester United; he cited this as his most memorable game because of the cheers at the end, which he described as a "lions' roar".

In June 2002, Collina reached the pinnacle of his career, when he was chosen for the World Cup final, between Brazil and Germany. Prior to the game, Germany's Oliver Kahn told the Irish Times: "Collina is a world-class referee, there's no doubt about that, but he doesn't bring luck, does he?" Kahn was referring to two previous high-profile matches that Collina had refereed which involved Kahn: the aforementioned 1999 UEFA Champions League Final, a 2–1 defeat for Bayern; and Germany's 5–1 defeat against England in September 2001. Kahn's luck did not change in the final, and his team lost 2–0.

He refereed the 2004 UEFA Cup Final between Valencia and Marseille. UEFA Euro 2004 was his last major international tournament, as in February 2005, as he reached the mandatory retirement age. His last international match was Portugal – Slovakia, for a 2006 FIFA World Cup qualifier at Estádio da Luz in Lisbon.

The FIGC raised its mandatory retirement age to 46 in order to accommodate Collina for a further season. However, a dispute emerged between the federation and Collina early in August 2005, following his decision to sign a sponsorship deal with Opel (also advertising for Vauxhall Motors in the United Kingdom – both are owned by General Motors). As Opel was also a sponsor of Serie A club A.C. Milan, the deal was seen as a conflict of interest, and Collina was not allowed to referee top flight matches in Italy. In response, Collina handed in his resignation, effectively ending his career. The Italian Referees Association then attempted to reject his resignation, but he persisted with his retirement from the league. 

Collina attracted the ire of Luciano Moggi, the Juventus executive and chief instigator of the 2006 Italian football scandal. Collina was one of the referees that Moggi attempted to have punished for decisions that were made against Juventus. In an intercepted phone call, Moggi claimed that Collina and his colleague Roberto Rosetti were too "objective" and should be "punished" for it. As a result, he and Rosetti were two of the few referees that emerged unscathed from the scandal.

After retiring from Serie A, Collina refereed the Soccer Aid matches for charity in May 2006 and September 2008. During the latter of these games, Collina was involved in an awkward fall and was stretchered off after 21 minutes of play. He later refereed the first half of the 2010 Soccer Aid match.

His final competitive game was a Champions League qualifier between Everton and Villarreal on 24 August 2005. He announced his retirement soon after the game.

Later career
Collina was appointed head of referees for the Football Federation of Ukraine since 2010. His work in this position is criticised by national referees who disapprove of his lack of involvement in Ukrainian football (spending not more than two weeks per year in Ukraine) and possible tolerance towards corruption in the Ukrainian national football association.

Collina was involved in the introduction and evaluation of the video assistant referee system for the 2018 World Cup. During the tournament he pointed out the system's effectiveness and later commented positively on its application.

Personal life

In 1988, Collina met his future wife Gianna in Versilia. After living together almost from their meeting, they moved to the coastal town of Viareggio. Since their marriage, the couple have had two daughters. In 2003, Collina published his autobiography, My Rules of the Game (Le Mie Regole del Gioco). In August 2005, after his retirement, he concentrated on his own business, as a financial advisor. Today he lives in Forte dei Marmi.

After refereeing the Second Round match between Japan and Turkey at the 2002 FIFA World Cup, Collina became famous in Japan, and appeared in a television advert for frozen takoyaki products. He is also very popular in Turkey, as no Turkish team, national or club, lost a game with him in charge.

Although Collina is closely identified with football, his favourite sports club plays basketball. He is a lifelong supporter of local club Fortitudo Bologna. On 25 January 2010, Collina participated in a special match for supporting victims of the earthquake in Haiti between a team called "Friends of Zidane and Ronaldo" and Benfica in Lisbon.

Other media
In July 2002, he appeared in cartoon form in George Michael's video "Shoot the Dog".

Collina was chosen as the cover figure for the football video games Pro Evolution Soccer 3 and Pro Evolution Soccer 4, appearing alongside compatriot Francesco Totti and Thierry Henry for the latter. This was unusual, as football games had come to almost exclusively feature only players and managers on their covers, and he did not feature in either game. In addition, he featured as an "unlockable" referee in the rival EA Sports game FIFA Football 2005, released shortly before Pro Evolution Soccer 4.

In September 2005, his easily recognisable face (to followers of football) also led to his appearance in an advert for the Vauxhall Vectra, which aired during the 2006 World Cup in the United Kingdom. He also appeared in adverts, for MasterCard and Adidas during the tournament. In 2006, Collina appeared in another television advert, this time for MB Pivo, a beer brand in Serbia. In 2003, he also appeared in an advert of a Turkish GSM operator, Aria, due to his popularity in Turkey.

Honours
IFFHS World's Best Referee: 1998, 1999, 2000, 2001, 2002, 2003
IFFHS All Time World's Best Referee 1987–2020
Honorary degree: Doctor of Science (2004), awarded by Hull University "for his contribution to the world of sport"
Serie A Referee of the Year: 1997, 1998, 2000, 2002, 2003, 2004, 2005
Italian Football Hall of Fame: 2011

Major matches refereed

References
General
My Rules of the Game: Pierluigi Collina (translated from the Italian by Iain Halliday), Macmillan, 2003.  Original title: Le Mie Regole del Gioco.

Specific

External links

 Pierluigi Collina

1960 births
Living people
Sportspeople from Bologna
Italian football referees
Olympic football referees
1998 FIFA World Cup referees
UEFA Champions League referees
UEFA Euro 2000 referees
2002 FIFA World Cup referees
FIFA World Cup Final match officials
UEFA Euro 2004 referees
Italian economists
Italian money managers
People with alopecia universalis
Italian expatriate sportspeople in Ukraine